Hemipenthes seminigra is a fly in the family Bombyliidae (bee-flies) endemic to North America.

Description
The species is 8–12 mm long, with a brown-black body marked by a strip of white hairs along the thorax. The short, round black head bears short antennae. The wings often have a white spot in the center.

Habitat
This species occurs in forests and on forest edges.

References

Berliner Entomologische Zeitschrift, 1869, Vol. 13 by Loew, pp. 27–28.
Biologia Centrali-Americana, 1886–1901 by Osten Sacken, pg. 115 and pp. 131–132.
Journal of the Kansas Entomological Society 1962, vol. 35, by Painter & Painter, pg. 102.
Zootaxa, 2009, #2074 Hemipenthes by Avalos-Hernandez, pp. 37–38. 

Bombyliidae
Insects described in 1869